The 2014 Italian Basketball Cup was the 46th season of the Italian Basketball Cup. The tournament was held from 7 February till 9 February 2014 at the Mediolanum Forum in Milan.

Banco di Sardegna Sassari won its first cup in franchise history. Travis Diener was named Finals MVP.

Participants
The following eight teams qualified based on their standings in the 2012–13 Lega Basket Serie A.
Enel Brindisi
Acqua Vitasnella Cantù
EA7 Emporio Armani Milano
Montepaschi Siena
Acea Roma
Banco di Sardegna Sassari
Grissin Bon Reggio Emilia
Umana Venezia

Bracket

References

2014
Cup
Sports competitions in Milan